Royal Manitoba Theatre Centre (RMTC) is Canada's oldest English-language regional theatre. It was founded in 1958 by John Hirsch and Tom Hendry as an amalgamation of the Winnipeg Little Theatre and Theatre 77. The following is a chronological list of the Mainstage, Warehouse, and Regional Tour productions that have been staged since its inception.

1958–1959
A Hatful of Rain by Michael V. Gazzo
The Glass Menagerie by Tennessee Williams
Ring Round the Moon adapted by Christopher Fry, based on the play Invitation to the Castle by  Jean Anouilh
Of Mice and Men by John Steinbeck
Blithe Spirit by Noël Coward
Teach Me How to Cry by Patricia Joudry
Born Yesterday by Garson Kanin
The Diary of Anne Frank dramatized by Frances Goodrich and Albert Hackett, based upon the book Anne Frank: The Diary of a Young Girl

1959–1960
Solid Gold Cadillac by Howard Teichmann and George S. Kaufman
Tea and Sympathy by Robert Anderson
On Borrowed Time by Paul Osborn, based on the novel by Lawrence Edward Watkin
Reclining Figure by Harry Kurnitz
Look Back in Anger by John Osborne
Volpone by Ben Jonson
Teahouse of the August Moon by John Patrick, based on a novel by Vern J. Sneider
Anastasia by Marcelle Maurette

1960–1961
Mr. Roberts by Joshua Logan, based on the novel by Thomas Heggen
Gaslight by Patrick Hamilton
A Streetcar Named Desire by Tennessee Williams
Biggest Thief in Town by Dalton Trumbo
Dark of the Moon by William Berney and Howard Richardson
Juno and the Paycock by Seán O'Casey
Visit to a Small Planet by Gore Vidal
Four Poster by Jan de Hartog
The Lesson by Eugène Ionesco
The Marriage Proposal by Anton Chekhov
Oh Dad, Poor Dad, Mama's Hung You in the Closet and I'm Feelin' So Sad by Arthur Kopit
Under Milk Wood by Dylan Thomas

1961–1962
The Lady's Not for Burning by Christopher Fry
Speaking of Murder by Audrey Roos and William Roos
The Playboy of the Western World by J. M. Synge
Arms and the Man by George Bernard Shaw
The Boy Friend music, book, and lyrics by Sandy Wilson
Separate Tables by Terence Rattigan
Thieves' Carnival by Jean Anouilh
Look Ahead! by Len Peterson
Waiting for Godot by Samuel Beckett

1962–1963
Bonfires of 1962 by Neil Harris, Eric Donkin, Mort Forer, Goldie Gelmon, Tom Hendry, Chuck Thompson, Marilyn Gardner, Paddy Armstrong and Murray Grand
Once More, with Feeling! by Harry Kurnitz
A Very Close Family by Bernard Slade
An Enemy of the People by Henrik Ibsen
Mrs. Warren's Profession by George Bernard Shaw
Pal Joey music by Richard Rodgers, lyrics by Lorenz Hart, and book by John O’Hara
Summer of the Seventeenth Doll by Ray Lawler
The Caretaker by Harold Pinter
The Spirit of the People is a Sometime Thing by Jack Ofield
The Love Merchants by Jack Ofield

1963–1964
Private Lives by Noël Coward
Pygmalion by George Bernard Shaw
The Hostage by Brendan Behan
A Midsummer Night's Dream by William Shakespeare
Little Mary Sunshine music, lyrics, and book by Rick Besoyan
Five Finger Exercise by Peter Shaffer
The Gazebo by Alec Coppel
Cat on a Hot Tin Roof by Tennessee Williams
Ding Dong Dell, Dandin's in the Well adapted by Betty Jane Wylie from the comedy George Dandin by Moliere
Endgame by Samuel Beckett

1964–1965
Hay Fever by Noël Coward
All About Us by Len Peterson
Mother Courage by Bertolt Brecht, English adaptation by Eric Bentley
The Taming of the Shrew by William Shakespeare
Irma La Douce book and lyrics by Alexandre Breffort, music by Marguerite Monnot, English book & lyrics by Julian More, David Heneker, and Monty Norman.
Heartbreak House by George Bernard Shaw
Who's Afraid of Virginia Woolf? by Edward Albee
The Typists and the Tiger by Murray Schisgal

1965–1966
The Private Ear and The Public Eye by Peter Schaffer
The Importance of Being Earnest by Oscar Wilde
Andorra by Max Frisch
The Tempest by William Shakespeare
The Threepenny Opera by Bertolt Brecht and Kurt Weill
Nicholas Romanov by William Kinsolving
The Fantasticks music by Harvey Schmidt, lyrics by Tom Jones
The Dance of Death by August Strindberg

1966–1967
Charley's Aunt by Brandon Thomas
The Rainmaker by N. Richard Nash
Galileo by Bertolt Brecht
A Funny Thing Happened on the Way to the Forum music and lyrics by Stephen Sondheim, book by Burt Shevelove and Larry Gelbart
Romeo and Juliet by William Shakespeare
Lulu Street by Ann Henry
Luv by Murray Schisgal

1967–1968
Major Barbara by George Bernard Shaw
Oh, What a Lovely War! by Joan Littlewood
Antigone by Sophocles
Sganarelle by Molière, English version by Miles Malleson
Three Sisters by Anton Chekhov
The Fantasticks, music by Harvey Schmidt, lyrics by Tom Jones
A Thousand Clowns by Herb Gardner
A Delicate Balance by Edward Albee

1968–1969
Fiddler on the Roof book by Joseph Stein, music by Jerry Bock, lyrics by Sheldon Harnick,
A Man for All Seasons by Robert Bolt
Hotel Paradiso by Georges Feydeau and Maurice Desvallieres, translation by Peter Glenville
Cactus Flower by Abe Burrows, based on the play Fleur de cactus by Pierre Barillet and Jean-Pierre Gredy
Happy Days by Samuel Beckett
Exit the King by Eugene Ionesco
The School for Wives by Molière
Red Magic by Michel de Ghelderode, translation by George Hauger
Fortune and Men's Eyes by John Herbert
Home Free by Lanford Wilson
The Zoo Story by Edward Albee
How the Puppets Formed a Government by Theatre Across the Street

1969–1970
Man of La Mancha, book by Dale Wasserman, lyrics by Joe Darion, music by Mitch Leigh
Cabaret, book by Joe Masteroff, lyrics by Fred Ebb, John Van Druten, and Christopher Isherwood, music by John Kander
Marat/Sade by Peter Weiss, translation by Geoffrey Skelton and Adrian Mitchell
You Can't Take It with You by Moss Hart and George S. Kaufman
After the Fall by Arthur Miller
Hail Scrawdyke! by David Halliwell
Harry, Noon and Night by Ronald Ribman
Mandragola by Niccolò Machiavelli
La Ronde by Arthur Schnitzler
Escurial by Michel de Ghelderode
The Indian Wants the Bronx by Israel Horovitz
La Turista by Sam Shepard

1970–1971
A Man's a Man by Bertolt Brecht
Long Day's Journey Into Night by Eugene O’Neill
Salvation by Peter Link, book, music & lyrics by C.C. Courtney
Hobson's Choice by Harold Brighouse
War and Peace by Alfred Neumann and Erwin Piscator, adapted by Guntram Prufer and Leo Tolstoy from the novel War and Peace by Leo Tolstoy, translation by Robert David MacDonald
Little Murders by Jules Feiffer
The Sun Never Sets by Patrick Crean
Tomorrow is St. Valentine's Day by William Shakespeare

1971–1972
What the Butler Saw by Joe Orton
Alice Through the Looking-Glass by Lewis Carroll, adapted by Keith Turnball, music by Allan Laing
The Homecoming by Harold Pinter
The Sun and the Moon by James Reaney
Lady Frederick by W. Somerset Maugham
The Comedy of Errors by William Shakespeare
Head 'Em Off at the Pas by John Wood

1972–1973
A Streetcar Named Desire by Tennessee Williams
Sleuth by Anthony Shaffer
A Thurber Carnival by James Thurber
Hedda Gabler by Henrik Ibsen
Guys and Dolls book by Jo Swerling and Abe Burrows, music and lyrics by Frank Loesser 
Hamlet by William Shakespeare
Rosencrantz and Guildenstern Are Dead by Tom Stoppard
The Promise by Aleksei Arbuzov
En Pièces Detachées by Michel Tremblay, translation by Allan Van Meer
Jacques Brel Is Alive and Well and Living in Paris by Jacques Brel, English lyrics & additional material by Eric Blau and Mort Shuman
Wedding in White by William Fruet

1973–1974
You Never Can Tell by George Bernard Shaw
A Day in the Death of Joe Egg by Peter Nichols
The Dybbuk by Sholem Anksy, adapted by John Hirsch
Godspell by John-Michael Tebelak, music and lyrics by Stephen Schwartz
The Plough and the Stars by Seán O'Casey
Indian by George Ryga
Black Comedy by Peter Schaffer
Mime Over Five by Canadian Mime Theatre
Esker Mike and His Wife Agiluk by Herschel Hardin
You're Gonna be Alright, Jamie-Boy by David Freeman
Jubalay by Patrick Rose and Merv Campone

1974–1975
The Sunshine Boys by Neil Simon
The Cherry Orchard by Anton Chekhov, translation by David Magarshack
The Boy Friend by Sandy Wilson
Forget-Me-Not-Lane by Peter Nichols
Red Emma, Queen of the Anarchists by Carol Bolt
Trelawny of the "Wells" by Arthur Wing Pinero
Old Times by Harold Pinter
Hosanna by Michel Tremblay, translation by John Van Burek and Bill Glassco
The Knack by Ann Jellicoe
Crabdance by Beverley Simons

1975–1976
Cyrano de Bergerac by Edmond Rostand, translation and adaptation by Anthony Burgess
The Price by Arthur Miller
Equus by Peter Shaffer
Company by George Furth, music and lyrics by Stephen sondhein
Of Mice and Men by John Steinbeck
Private Lives by Noël Coward
The Collected Works of Billy The Kid by Michael Ondaatje
Theatre Beyond Words by Canadian Mime Theatre
Endgame by Samuel Beckett
Creeps by David Freeman

1976–1977
Twelfth Night by William Shakespeare
All Over by Edward Albee
Relatively Speaking by Alan Ayckbourn
Dames at Sea book and lyrics by George Haimsohn and Robin Miller, music by Jim Wise
The Crucible by Arthur Miller
She Stoops to Conquer by Oliver Goldsmith
Berlin to Broadway with Kurt Weill lyrics by Maxwell Anderson, Marc Blitzstein, Bertolt Brecht, Jacques Deval, Michael Feingold, Ira Gershwin, Paul Green, Langston Hughes, Alan Jay Lerner, Ogden Nash, George Tabori, and Arnold Weinstein, music by Kurt Weill, text and format by Gene Lerner
Canadian Gothic by Joanna M. Glass
American Modern by Joanna M. Glass
Waiting for Godot by Samuel Beckett
Alpha Beta by E.A. Whitehead
Fables Here and Then by David Feldshuh

1977–1978
The Last Chalice by Joanna M. Glass
Knock Knock by Jules Feiffer
The Contractor by David Storey
The Night of the Iguana by Tennessee Williams
Measure for Measure by William Shakespeare
The Royal Hunt of the Sun by Peter Shaffer
Hello and Goodbye by Athol Fugard
Oh Coward! words and music by Noël Coward, devised by Roderick Cook
Love is Meant to Make us Glad by David Brown and Pat Galloway
The Sea Horse by Edward J. Moore
Ashes by David Rudkin
For Love and Chicken Soup by Brad Leiman

1978–1979
A Midsummer Night's Dream by William Shakespeare
A Doll's House by Henrik Ibsen, translation by John Lingard
How the Other Half Loves by Alan Ayckbourn
Death of a Salesman by Arthur Miller
Veronica's Room by Ira Levin
A Bee in her Bonnet by George Feydeau, translation by Brian Blakey
Forever Yours, Marie-Lou by Michel Tremblay
Theatre Beyond Words by Theatre Beyond Words
The Zoo Story by Edward Albee
Sexual Perversity in Chicago by David Mamet
Sizwe Bansi is Dead by Athol Fugard

1979–1980
Travesties by Tom Stoppard
Artichoke by Joanna M. Glass
Absurd Person Singular by Alan Ayckbourn
The Seagull by Anton Chekhov, translation and adaptation by Arif Hasnain
The Diary of Anne Frank, a dramatization by Frances Goodrich & Albert Hackett
Dracula, dramatized by Hamilton Deane & John L. Balderston from the novel by Bram Stoker
American Buffalo by David Mamet
Circus Gothic by Jan Kudelka
Waiting for the Parade by John Murrell
Talley's Folly by Lanford Wilson
Spokesong by Stewart Parker

1980–1981
Billy Bishop Goes to War by John MacLachlan Gray and Eric Peterson
Jitters by David French
Balconville by David Fennario
Grease by Jim Jacobs and Warren Casey
The Elephant Man by Bernard Pomerance
As You Like It by William Shakespeare
Betrayal by Harold Pinter
Macbeth by William Shakespeare
Bent by Martin Sherman
1837: The Farmers' Revolt by Rick Salutin and Theatre Passe Muraille

1981–1982
Encore Brel! by Jacques Brel, English lyrics by Richard Ouzounian, Alasdair Clayre, Rod McKuen, and Paul Austen
Candida by George Bernard Shaw
The Black Bonspiel of Wullie MacCrimmon by W. O. Mitchell
The Taming of the Shrew by William Shakespeare
The Little Foxes by Lillian Hellman
The Importance of Being Earnest by Oscar Wilde
The Gin Game by D. L. Coburn
The Tempest by William Shakespeare
Thimblerig by Alf Silver
A Moon for the Misbegotten by Eugene O'Neill
Side by Side by Sondheim music and lyrics by Stephen Sondheim, Leonard Bernstein, Mary Rodgers, Richard Rodgers, and Jule Styne, by arrangement with Cameron Mackintosh
Billy Bishop Goes to War by John Gray, in collaboration with Eric Peterson, Music and Lyrics by John Gray.

1982–1983
Nicholas Nickleby by Charles Dickens, adapted by Richard Ouzounian
Blood Relations by Sharon Pollock
The Man Who Came to Dinner by Moss Hart and George S. Kaufman
Richard III by William Shakespeare
The Three Musketeers by Alexandre Dumas
Mass Appeal by Bill C. Davis
Fifth of July by Lanford Wilson
How I Got That Story by Amlin Gray
Paper Wheat by 25th Street Theatre
Cloud 9 by Caryl Churchill
Climate of the Times by Alf Silver

1983–1984
The Mikado music by Arthur Sullivan, libretto by W. S. Gilbert
A Tale of Two Cities by Charles Dickens, adapted for the stage by Richard Ouzounian
Much Ado About Nothing by William Shakespeare
The Duchess of Malfi by John Webster
Bedroom Farce by Alan Ayckbourn
The Dining Room by A.R. Gurney Jr.
La Sagouine by Antonine Maillet
The Actor's Nightmare by Christopher Durang
Sister Mary Ignatius Explains It All for You by Christopher Durang
Remember Me by Michel Tremblay, translation by John Stowe
Clearances by Alf Silver, based on a scenario by Ian F. Ross
Ten Lost Years by Barry Broadfoot

1984–1985
Amadeus by Peter Shaffer
Old World by Aleksei Arbuzov, translation by Adriadne Nicolaeff
Quiet in the Land by Anne Chislett
Born Yesterday by Garson Kanin
Quartermaine's Terms by Simon Gray
Tartuffe by Molière
La Sagouine by Antonine Maillet, translation by Luis De Cespedes
Sea Marks by Gardner McKay
'Night, Mother by Marsha Norman
Beautiful Deeds by Marie-Lynn Hammond
Automatic Pilot by Erika Ritter

1985–1986
Barnum Music by Cy Coleman, lyrics by Michael Stewart, book by Mark Bramble
The Real Thing by Tom Stoppard
Tsymbaly by Ted Galay
Talking Dirty by Sherman Snukal
Hamlet by William Shakespeare
Filthy Rich by George F. Walker
Einstein by Gabriel Emanuel
Fool for Love by Sam Shepard
Once in a Million by T.H. Hatte
The Last Doors' Bootleg by Alan Williams
Garrison's Garage by Ted Johns

1986–1987
Brighton Beach Memoirs by Neil Simon
A Christmas Carol by Charles Dickens
Mirandolina by Carlo Goldoni, translation and adapted by Olwen Wymark
Doc by Sharon Pollock
I'm Not Rappaport by Herb Gardner
The Foreigner by Larry Shue
The Double Bass by Patrick Süskind, translation by Roy Kift
We Can't Pay? We Won't Pay! by Dario Fo
Salt-Water Moon by David French
Henry V by William Shakespeare
Life After Hockey by Kenneth Brown

1987–1988
Royalty is Royalty by W.O. Mitchell
101 Miracles of Hope Chance by Allan Stratton
Ten Little Indians by Agatha Christie
You Never Can Tell by George Bernard Shaw
The Road to Mecca by Athol Fugard
Morning's at Seven by Paul Osborn
The Rez Sisters by Tomson Highway
Letter From Wingfield Farm by Dan Needles
Loot by Joe Orton
The Unseen Hand by Sam Shepard
Killer's Head by Sam Shepard
The Club by Eve Merriam
Life After Hockey by Kenneth Brown

1988–1989
B-Movie, The Play by Tom Wood
1949 by David French
Falstaff by William Shakespeare, adapted by Victor Cowie
Woman in Mind by Alan Ayckbourn
A View From the Bridge by Arthur Miller
Brass Rubbings by Gordon Pinsent
Frankie and Johnny in the Clair de Lune by Terrence McNally
When That I Was by John Mortimer and Edward Atienza
Life Skills by David King
A Walk in the Woods by Lee Blessing
Frankenstein: Playing with Fire adapted by Barbara Field from the novel by Mary Shelby
The Mousetrap by Agatha Christie

1989–1990
Broadway Bound by Neil Simon
Emerald City by David Williamson
Cat on a Hot Tin Roof by Tennessee Williams
The Mousetrap by Agatha Christie
Master Class by David Pownall
You Can't Take It With You by George S. Kaufman & Moss Hart
Kiss of the Spider Woman by Manuel Puig
Beautiful Lake Winnipeg by Maureen Hunter
Driving Miss Daisy by Alfred Uhry
The Dragons' Trilogy by Le Théâtre Repere
The Glass Menagerie by Tennessee Williams

1990–1991
The Heidi Chronicles by Wendy Wasserstein
Macbeth by William Shakespeare
Noises Off by Michael Frayn
Sherlock Holmes and the Speckled Band by Arthur Conan Doyle
Of the Fields, Lately by David French
Les Misérables by Alain Boublil and Claude-Michel Schönberg, based on the novel by Victor Hugo, music by Claude-Michel Schönberg, French lyrics by Alain Boublil, English lyrics by Herbert Kretzmer, original French text by Alain Boublil and Jean-Marc Natel
Dry Lips Oughta Move to Kapuskasing by Tomson Highway
Toronto, Mississippi by Joan MacLeod
Burn This by Lanford Wilson
My Children! My Africa! by Athol Fugard
Letter from Wingfield Farm by Dan Needles

1991–1992
M. Butterfly by David Henry Hwang
Hedda Gabler by Henrik Ibsen, new translation by Per Brask
Not Wanted on the Voyage by Timothy Findley
Lend Me a Tenor by Ken Ludwig
Shirley Valentine by Willy Russell
The Miracle Worker by William Gibson
Wingfield Trilogy by Dan Needles
Goodnight Desdemona (Good Morning Juliet) by Ann Marie MacDonald
The Affections of May by Norm Foster
Medea by Euripides, freely adapted by Robinson Jeffers

1992–1993
Another Time by Ronald Harwood
A Midsummer Night's Dream by William Shakespeare
Transit of Venus by Maureen Hunter
Arsenic and Old Lace by Joseph Kesselring
Democracy by John Murrell
Lost in Yonkers by Neil Simon
Unidentified Human Remains and the True Nature of Love by Brad Fraser
Death and the Maiden by Ariel Dorfman
Gunmetal Blues by Richard March and Marion Adler
Steel Magnolias by Robert Harling
Letter From Wingfield Farmby Dan Needles

1993–1994
Dancing at Lughnasa by Brian Friel
A Christmas Carol - The Musical by Mavor Moore, based upon the novel by Charles Dickens
Wait Until Dark by Frederick Knott
Henceforward... by Alan Ayckbourn
Hay Fever by Noël Coward
Wingfield's Folly by Dan Needles
Lips Together, Teeth Apart by Terrence McNally
Awful Manors by Ronnie Burkett
Mrs. Klein by Nicholas Wright
The Search for Signs of Intelligent Life in the Universe by Jane Wagner
Steel Magnolias by Robert Harling

1994–1995
Oleanna by David Mamet
The Sisters Rosensweig by Wendy Wasserstein
The Tragedy of Hamlet, Prince of Denmark by William Shakespeare
Six Degrees of Separation by John Guare
If We Are Women by Joanna McClelland Glass
Homeward Bound by Elliott Hayes
Fronteras Americanas (American Borders) by Guillermo Verdecchia
Tinka's New Dress by Ronnie Burkett
Poor Super Man by Brad Fraser
The Monument by Colleen Wagner
The Wingfield Farm Trilogy by Dan Needles

1995–1996
Keely & Du by Jane Martin
Season's Greetings by Alan Ayckbourn
Dr. Jekyll & Mr. Hyde - A Love Story by James W. Nichol, inspired by the novel by Robert Louis Stevenson
Atlantis by Maureen Hunter
Cyrano de Bergerac by Edmond Rostand, translation and adaptation by Anthony Burgess
Little Shop of Horrors - The Musical by ward Ashman and Alan Menken
Our Country's Good by Timberlake Wertenbaker, based upon the novel the Playmaker by Thomas Keneally
Angels in America, A Gay Fantasia on National Themes, Part One: Millennium Approaches by Tony Kushner
Les Belles Soeurs by Michel Tremblay
Lady Day at Emerson's Bar and Grill by Lanie Robertson, musical arrangements by Danny Holgate
Transit of Venus by Maureen Hunter

1996–1997
Picasso at the Lapin Agile by Steve Martin
Arcadia by Tom Stoppard
Death of a Salesman by Arthur Miller
There Goes the Bride by Ray Cooney and John Chapman
The Glace Bay Miners' Museum by Wendy Lill, based on the novel by Sheldon Currie
Travels With My Aunt by Graham Greene, adapted by Giles Havergal
An Inspector Calls by J.B. Priestley
True West by Sam Shepard
Misery by Simon Moore, adapted from the novel by Stephen King
None Is Too Many by Jason Sherman, based on the book by Irving Abella and Harold Troper

1997–1998
A Perfect Garnesh by Terrence McNally
Master Class by Terrence McNally
Office Hours by Norm Foster
The Crucible by Arthur Miller
Three Tall Women by Edward Albee
Sylvia by A.R. Gurney
Quills by Doug Wright
High Life by Lee MacDougall
Skylight by David Hare
Street of Blood by Ronnie Burkett

1998–1999
Cabaret book by Joe Masteroff, lyrics by Fred Ebb, music by John Kander
Of Mice and Men by John Steinbeck
Proposals by Neil Simon
Blessings in Disguise by Douglas Beattie
Billy Bishop Goes to War by John MacLachlan Gray and Eric Peterson
Lady Be Good music and lyrics by George Gershwin and Ira Gershwin, book by Guy Bolton and Fred Thompson
Wit by Margaret Edson
Cherry Docs by David Gow
How I Learned to Drive by Paula Vogel
The Attic, The Pearls & Three Fine Girls by Jennifer Brewin, Leah Cherniak, Ann-Marie MacDonald, Alisa Palmer, & Martha Ross
Macbeth by William Shakespeare, adapted by Kevin Williamson

1999–2000
'Art' by Yasmina Reza
King Lear by William Shakespeare
2 Pianos, 4 Hands by Ted Dykstra and Richard Greenblatt
A Streetcar Named Desire by Tennessee Williams
Wingfield Unbound by Dan Needles
The Overcoat by Morris Panych and Wendy Gorling
Patience by Jason Sherman
Closer by Patrick Marber
The Beauty Queen of Leenane by Martin McDonagh
The Last Night of Ballyhoo by Alfred Uhry
Ethan Claymore's Christmas by Norm Foster

2000–2001
To Kill A Mockingbird by Harper Lee and Christopher Sergel
The Complete Works of William Shakespeare (abridged) by Adam Long, Daniel Singer, and Jess Winfield
Camelot by Alan Lerner and Frederick Loewe
The Weir by Conor McPherson
The Drawer Boy by Michael Healey
Larry's Party by Carol Shields, Richard Ouzonian and Marek Norman
The Gist by John Kriznac
Waiting for Godot by Samuel Beckett
A Penny for the Guy by Lanie Robertson
Happy by Ronnie Burkett

2001–2002
The Wave by Olaf Pyttlik, based on a true story by Ron Jones
The School for Wives by Molière
Syncopation by Allan Knee
Vinci by Maureen Hunter
Stones in His Pockets by Marie Jones
The Rainmaker by N. Richard Nash
The Lost Boys by R. H. Thomson
The Threepenny Opera by Bertolt Brecht and Kurt Weill
The Blue Room by David Hare
The Lonesome West by Martin McDonagh
Wingfield unbound by Dan Needles

2002–2003
Proof by David Auburn
Dracula by Hamilton Deane
Evita lyrics by Tim Rice, music by Andrew Lloyd Webber
The Philadelphia Story by Philip Barry
Over the River and Through the Woods by Joe Dipietro
Richard III by William Shakespeare
The Shape of Things by Neil LaBute
The Homecoming by Harold Pinter
Time After Time: The Chet Baker Project by James O'Reilly
Bigger Than Jesus by Rick Miller and Daniel Brooks

2003–2004
Cookin' at the Cookery: The Music & Times of Alberta Hunter
The Diary of Anne Frank by Frances Goodrich and Albert Hackett
My Fair Lady book and lyrics by Alan Jay Lerner, music by Frederick Loewe
Tuesdays with Morrie by Jeffrey Hatcher and Mitch Albom
The Winslow Boy by Terence Rattigan
Crimes of the Heart by Beth Henley
Feelgood by Alistair Beaton
Who's Afraid of Virginia Woolf? by Edward Albee
I, Claudia by Kirsten Thomson
Mating Dance of the Werewolf by Mark Stein

2004–2005
Humble Boy by Charlotte Jones
Night of the Iguana by Tennessee Williams
Much Ado About Nothing by William Shakespeare
Trying by Joanna Glass
The Dresser by Ronald Harwood
Mamma Mia! music and lyrics by Benny Andersson and Björn Ulvaeus, some songs with Stig Anderson, book by Catherine JohnsonReal Live Girl by Damien AtkinsHosanna by Michel TremblayProvenance by Ronnie BurkettThe Last Five Years by Jason Robert Brown

2005–2006Crowns by Regina Taylor, adapted from the book by Michael Cunningham & Craig MarberryA Christmas Carol adapted by Bruce McManus, from the novel by Charles DickensGuys and Dolls music and lyrics by Frank Loesser, book by Jo Swerling and Abe BurrowsThe Innocent Eye Test by Michael HealeyThe Clean House by Sarah RuhlDriving Miss Daisy by Alfred UhryThe Goat, or Who Is Sylvia? by Edward AlbeeCul-de-sac by Daniel MacIvorLong Day's Journey into Night by Eugene O’NeillFully Committed by Becky Mode

2006–2007The Tempest by William ShakespeareOrpheus Descending by Tennessee WilliamsThe Rocky Horror Show by Richard O'BrienHalf Life by John MightonThe Constant Wife by Somerset MaughamOver the Tavern by Tom DudzickThe Retreat from Moscow by William NicholsonSummer of My Amazing Luck by Chris CraddockThe Real Thing by Tom StoppardWhat Lies Before Us by Morris Panych

2007–2008Our Town by Thornton WilderThe Importance of Being Earnest by Oscar WildeFiddler on the Roof by Jerry Bock, Sheldon Harnick, and Joseph SteinShakespeare's Dog by Rick ChafeThe Syringa Tree by Pamela GienDreamgirls by Tom Eyen and Henry KriegerHardsell by Rick Miller and Daniel BrooksGlengarry Glen Ross by David MametRope's End by Douglas BowieThe Satchmo' Suite by Hans Böggild and Doug Innis

2008–2009Pride and Prejudice by Jane AustenMedea by Euripides and Robinson JeffersJitters by David FrenchThe Blonde, the Brunette and the Vengeful Redhead by Robert HewettDoubt, A Parable by John Patrick ShanleyThe Boys in the Photograph by Ben EltonScorched by Wajdi Mouawad and Linda GaboriauThe Price by Arthur MillerBad Dates by Theresa RebeckBleeding Hearts by Kevin Klassen

2009–2010Strong Poison by Frances LimoncelliIt's a Wonderful Life: A Radio Play by Philip GrecianThe Drowsy Chaperone by Lisa Lambert, Greg Morrison, Bob Martin & Don McKellarMother Courage and Her Children by Bertolt Brecht, Peter Hinton, Paul Dessau, Kurt Weill, and Allen ColeEducating Rita by Willy RussellSteel Magnolias by Robert Harling5 O'Clock Bells by Pierre BraultEast of Berlin by Hannah MoscovitchTop Girls by Caryl ChurchillLooking Back - West by Robert Lewis Vaughan

2010–2011
Becomes the Royal Manitoba Theatre Centre in 2010.One Flew Over the Cuckoo's Nest by Dale Wasserman
Irving Berlin's White Christmas The Musical by Paul Blake, Irving Berlin, and David Ives
Noël Coward's Brief Encounter by Emma RiceThe Shunning by Patrick FriesenCalendar Girls by Tim FirthThe 39 Steps by Patrick BarlowJake's Gift by Julia MackeyThe Seafarer by Conor McPhersonAfter Miss Julie by Patrick MarberThe Drowning Girls by Beth Graham, Daniela Vlaskalic, & Charlie Tomlinson

2011–2012Grumpy Old Men, The Musical by Dan Remmes, Neil Berg, and Nick MeglinRomeo and Juliet by William ShakespeareShirley Valentine by Willy RussellThe Fighting Days by Wendy LillGod of Carnage by Yasmina RezaNext to Normal by Brian Yorkey and Tom KittIn the Next Room (or The Vibrator Play) by Sarah RuhlMrs. Warren's Profession by George Bernard ShawAugust: Osage County by Tracy LettsBlind Date by Rebecca Northan

2012–2013A Few Good Men by Aaron SorkinMiracle on South Division Street by Tom DudzickGone With the Wind by Niki LandauEd's Garage by Dan NeedlesDaddy Long Legs by Paul Gordon and John CairdOther People's Money by Jerry SternerRed by John LoganAssassins by Stephen Sondheim and John WeidmanThe Penelopiad by Margaret AtwoodRide the Cyclone: A Musical by Jacob Richmond and Brooke Maxwell

2013–2014Harvey by Mary ChaseA Christmas Story by Philip GrecianJane Eyre by Julie BeckmanThe Glass Menagerie by Tennessee WilliamsKim's Convenience by Ins ChoiGood People by David Lindsay-AbaireVenus in Fur by David IvesHirsch by Alon Nashman and Paul ThompsonThe Seagull by Anton ChekhovThe Secret Annex by Alix SoblerMiracle on South Division Street by Tom Dudzick

2014–2015Sherlock Holmes and the Case of the Jersey Lily by Katie ForgetteThe Heart of Robin Hood by David FarrCabaret by Joe Masteroff, music by John Kander, lyrics by Fred EbbVanya and Sonia and Masha and Spike by Christopher DurangThe Woman in Black by Stephen MallatrattClever Little Lies by Joe DiPietroArmstrong's War by Colleen MurphyThe Devil's Music: The Life and Blues of Bessie Smith by Angelo ParraPrivate Lives by Noël CowardLate Company by Jordan Tannahill

2015–2016The Man Who Shot Liberty Valance by Jethro ComptonAlice Through the Looking-Glass by James ReaneyBilly Elliot The Musical by Lee Hall and Elton JohnChimerica by Lucy KirkwoodUnnecessary Farce by Paul Slade SmithBOOM by Rick MillerSeminar by Theresa RebeckWiesenthal by Tom DuganThings We Do for Love by Alan AyckbournMyth of the Ostrich by Matt MurrayThe Hound of the Baskervilles adapted by Steven Canny & John Nicholson

2016–2017The Curious Incident of the Dog in the Night-Time by Simon StephensThe Audience by Peter MorganMillion Dollar Quartet by Colin Escott & Floyd MutruxBlack Coffee by Agatha ChristieBittergirl: the Musical by Annabel Fitzsimmons, Alison Lawrence & Mary Francis MooreSarah Ballenden by Maureen HunterMy Name is Asher Lev by Aaron Posner23.5 Hours by Carey CrimHand to God by Robert AskinsKill Me Now by Brad FraserLast Train to Nibroc by Arlene Hutton

2017–2018Shakespeare in Love - by Lee Hall, adapted from the screenplay by Tom Stoppard and Marc Norman A Christmas Carol - by Charles Dickens, adapted by Bruce McManusOnce - book by Enda Walsh, music and lyrics by Glen Hansard and Markéta IrglováThe Humans - by Stephen KaramMorning after Grace - by Carey CrimNine Dragons - by Jovanni SyOutside Mullingar - by John Patrick ShanleyDi and Viv and Rose - by Amelia BullmoreHeisenberg - by Simon Stephens

2018–2019Sense and Sensibility - by Jane Austen, adapted by Ellen PetersonIt's a Wonderful Life: The Radio Play - based on the film by Frank Capra, adapted by Philip GrecianMatilda the Musical - by Roald Dahl, adapted by Dennis Kelly, music and lyrics by Tim MinchinA Doll's House - by Henrik IbsenA Doll's House, Part 2 - by Lucas HnathBoom X - by Rick MillerThe Cottage - by Jake MacDonald887 - by Robert LepageVietgone - by Qui NguyenMade In Italy - by Farren TimoteoJohn - by Annie Baker

 2019-2020 

 The Color Purple - book by Marsha Norman and music and lyrics by Brenda Russell, Allee Willis, and Stephen Bray, based on the novel by Alice Walker
 Miss Bennet: Christmas at Pemberley - by Margot Melcon and Lauren Gunderson
 As You Like It - by William Shakespeare, co-produced with Citadel Theatre
 The New Canadian Curling Club - by Mark Crawford
 A Thousand Splendid Suns - by Ursula Rani Sarma, based on the book by Khaled Hosseini
 The Legend of Georgia McBride - by Matthew Lopez
 Bang Bang - by Kat Sandler
 Fun Home - adapted by Lisa Kron and Jeanine Tesori from the graphic memoir by Alison Bechdel
 Every Brilliant Thing - by Duncan Macmillan and Jonny Donahoe, co-produced with Talk Is Free Theatre
 Women of the Fur Trade - by Frances Koncan

 2022 

 The Wonderful Wizard of Oz'' - by L. Frank Baum

References

External links
Manitoba Theatre Centre

Canadian theatre company production histories
Theatre in Manitoba